"Something New" is a song by American singer Zendaya featuring fellow  American singer Chris Brown. It was released as a single on February 3, 2016, by Hollywood Records and Republic Records. The song samples TLC's "Creep".

Background
The song samples the 1994 TLC song "Creep", which Zendaya has noted as one of the things that attracted to her initially to the  song. She first recorded the song as a duet with musician Babyface although, his verse was later swapped out with one by Brown. After hearing Brown's verse, Zendaya rerecorded her verses, telling iHeartRadio that she didn't want to be shown up by him.

Music video
On February 3, 2016, Zendaya uploaded the audio for "Something New" on her YouTube account.
Three weeks later, on February 23, 2016, Zendaya uploaded the official lyric video of "Something New" on her Vevo channel.

However, its official music video remains unreleased with the exception of a 25-second clip shown on The Ellen DeGeneres Show. T-Boz also confirmed she shot a cameo in the video and pictures of her cameo are released by TLC fan page Cyber TLC World.

Zendaya decided to not have the music video premiered due to not wanting to associate with Chris Brown after he made light of singer Kehlani's statements on contemplating suicide. Years later in August 2020, Brown publicly asked Zendaya to release the music video, coincidingly sharing a 15 second snippet of the video on his Instagram stories.

Charts

References

2016 singles
2016 songs
Zendaya songs
Chris Brown songs
Hollywood Records singles
Republic Records singles
Songs written by Babyface (musician)
Songs written by Chris Brown
Songs written by Leon Thomas III
Song recordings produced by Babyface (musician)